Sun Li may refer to:

Sun Li (general) (died 250), a general of Cao Wei during the Three Kingdoms Period
Sun Li (writer, born 1913) (孙犁), Chinese novelist
Sun Li (writer, born 1949) (孙力), Chinese novelist
Sun Li (softball) (born 1981), Chinese softball player
Sun Li (actress) (born 1982), also known as Susan Sun, Chinese actress
Sun Li (Water Margin), a fictional character in the classical Chinese novel Water Margin